Madison Masonic Temple is the name of a historic  Masonic lodge building.  The building, also known as the Old Main Street Church, is located in Madison, Morris County, New Jersey, United States.  

The building was built in 1824 as the Presbyterian Church of Chatham Township, and was purchased by Madison Lodge #93 in 1930.  The building was added to the National Register of Historic Places on January 17, 2008.

See also
National Register of Historic Places listings in Morris County, New Jersey

References

Buildings and structures in Morris County, New Jersey
Clubhouses on the National Register of Historic Places in New Jersey
Federal architecture in New Jersey
Masonic buildings in New Jersey
Madison, New Jersey
National Register of Historic Places in Morris County, New Jersey
New Jersey Register of Historic Places